Out Of My Hands is the second album by British R&B singer Keisha White released on 3 July 2006 by Warner Bros. Records. The album is made up of song from Keisha's debut album Seventeen, including the leading single, "The Weakness in Me" and six brand new songs including "Don't Mistake Me" and "I Choose Life". The album peaked at #55 in the UK Albums Chart.

Critical reception 

Music OMH gave the album 4 star (out of a possible 5) noting that "Where Keisha will really win over her listeners is in the sultry down tempo tracks." Going on to say, "Fortunately the quality of songwriting is mostly good, with not much filler around."

Track listing

References 

2006 albums
Keisha White albums